Fitz-John Winthrop (March 14, 1637 – November 27, 1707), was the governor of the Colony of Connecticut from 1698 until his death on November 27, 1707.

Early life
Winthrop was born in Ipswich, Massachusetts, the eldest son of John Winthrop the Younger and Elizabeth (Reade) Winthrop. Winthrop was sent to Harvard, but failed the entrance examination.

Career
In 1658, Winthrop went to England. He served in the English New Model Army in Scotland under General George Monck. He accompanied Monck when he marched into England in 1660 at the head of his army and restored King Charles II to the throne. As part of the restoration settlement most of the army was paid off and disbanded.

Winthrop, remained in England and was in London in 1661 when his father presented his petition to obtain a charter for the establishment of a Connecticut colony. In April 1663, both returned to New London.

Winthrop returned to Connecticut and was a representative in 1671. He was a major in King Philip's War, and in July 1675, Winthrop requested Wombe, an Indian gunsmith captured by Ninigret, as a servant. In 1686 Winthrop was one of the council of Governor Andros. He was a Magistrate of Connecticut in 1689, and in 1690 Winthrop was appointed major-general and commanded the unsuccessful expedition of the New York and Connecticut forces against Canada. From 1693 to 1698 he was Agent of the Colony to Great Britain.
 He was appointed governor of Connecticut in 1696 and held the post until his death in 1707.

Personal life
About 1677, he entered into a common-law marriage with Elizabeth Tongue. Together, the couple had one daughter:

 Mary Winthrop (1683–1713), who married Johannes Livingston (1680–1720), son of Robert Livingston the Elder.

Winthrop died in Boston, Massachusetts, on November 27, 1707. He is interred at the King's Chapel Burying Ground in Boston, Massachusetts. His funeral service was conducted by Cotton Mather, who called his sermon there Winthropi justa.

Notes

References

External links

1637 births
1707 deaths
People from Ipswich, Massachusetts
Colonial governors of Connecticut
Winthrop family